Anthony Holden (born 22 May 1947) is an English writer, broadcaster and critic, particularly known as a biographer of artists including Shakespeare, Tchaikovsky, the essayist Leigh Hunt, the opera librettist Lorenzo Da Ponte and the actor Laurence Olivier, and of members of the British royal family, notably Charles, Prince of Wales. He has also published translations of opera and Ancient Greek poetry, as well as several autobiographical books about poker. In 2009, he was elected the first President of the International Federation of Poker (IFP).

Life

Anthony Ivan Holden was born in Southport, Lancashire, and educated at Oundle School and Merton College, Oxford, where he read English language and literature, edited the student magazine Isis and appeared on University Challenge.

A journalist before turning full-time writer, at the start of his career as a graduate trainee on Thomson Regional Newspapers' Hemel Hempstead Evening Post-Echo, Holden covered the trial in St Albans of the psychopathic poisoner, Graham Young. His book on the case, The St. Albans Poisoner (1974), was filmed as The Young Poisoner's Handbook (1995). Named Young Journalist of the Year in 1972, he was on the staff of The Sunday Times (1973–79), commended in the British Press Awards in 1976 as News Reporter of the Year for his work in Northern Ireland, and winning Columnist of the Year in 1977. He was Washington Correspondent and US editor of The Observer (1979–81), Assistant Editor of The Times (1981–82), Executive Editor, Today, (1985–86), and chief classical music critic of The Observer (2002–08).

In 1999–2000 he was an inaugural Fellow of the Center for Scholars and Writers at the New York Public Library. When he was a Whitbread Prize judge in 2000 he said it would have been a "national humiliation" if Harry Potter and the Prisoner of Azkaban had won, ahead of Seamus Heaney's translation of Beowulf.  He had threatened to resign if that happened. The novelist Robert Harris derided this threat as "pompous".

Holden was a member of the Board of Governors of the South Bank Centre 2002–08, during the landmark renovation programme under the chairmanship of Lord Hollick. Since 2006, he has been a Trustee of Shakespeare North Trust.

In May 2015, he gave the annual A.E. Housman lecture on the Name and Nature of Poetry at the Hay-on-Wye Festival.

He has also made frequent appearances on television, presenting such documentaries as Charles at Forty (ITV, 1988), Anthony Holden on Poker (BBC 2, 1991) and Who Killed Tchaikovsky? (Omnibus, BBC 1, 1993). In the mid-1980s, he presented a weekly BBC Radio 4 chat show, In the Air.

Holden's papers are collected at Boston University's Howard Gotlieb Archival Research Center.

He is a dedicated Arsenal fan and has a season ticket to the Emirates. Holden's maternal grandfather was Ivan Sharpe, the England international footballer and Olympic gold medallist who later became a celebrated sports writer.

He has been married twice, and has three sons and four grandchildren.

Poker

Holden is a keen poker player, and spent a year playing professionally while researching his 1990 book Big Deal: A Year as a Professional Poker Player, which has been praised by poker enthusiasts from David Mamet and Salman Rushdie to Walter Matthau. The book covers his experiences between the World Series of Poker (WSOP) tournaments in 1988 and 1989.

In 2007, Holden published Bigger Deal: A Year Inside the Poker Boom, a journal of his second stint as a professional player, between the 2005 and 2006 WSOP events.

In 2000, he won TV's first Celebrity Late Night Poker on Channel 4, beating Al Alvarez, Martin Amis, Victoria Coren, Ricky Gervais, Patrick Marber and Stephen Fry. In 2005, he appeared on the chat show Heads Up with Richard Herring to discuss his life, career and his love of poker. In 2006 he represented England in TV's World Cup of Poker, staged by PokerStars, for whom he was a sponsored player 2006–2008.

In 2009, he was elected the first President of the International Federation of Poker (IFP) at its founding congress in Lausanne, Switzerland. After four years in office, he resigned in April 2013.

Works
Aeschylus' Agamemnon (1969, translator and editor)
Greek Pastoral Poetry (1973, translator and editor)
The Greek Anthology (1973, contributor)
The St Albans Poisoner: The Life And Crimes Of Graham Young (1974, reissued 1995 as The Young Poisoner's Handbook)
Charles: Prince of Wales (1979); published as Prince Charles in US
Their Royal Highnesses, The Prince and Princess of Wales (1981)
A Week In The Life Of The Royal Family (1983)
Great Royal Front Pages: A Scrapbook of Historic Royal Events from Queen Victoria to Baby Prince William (1983)
Anthony Holden's Royal Quiz (1983)
Of presidents, Prime Ministers And Princes (1984)
Queen Mother (1985)
Don Giovanni: The Translation (1987, with Amanda Holden)
Laurence Olivier: A Biography (1988, reissued 2007)
Charles: A Biography (1988); published as King Charles III in US
The Last Paragraph. The Journalism of David Blundy (1990, editor)
Big Deal: A Year as a Professional Poker Player (1990)
The Queen Mother: A 90th Birthday Tribute (1990)
A Princely Marriage: Charles & Diana, the First Ten Years (1991)
Behind The Oscar: The Secret History of the Academy Awards (1993)
H.M. Queen Elizabeth the Queen Mother In Private (1993)
The Tarnished Crown (1993), Viking Publishers, .
Tchaikovsky (1995)
Diana: Her Life and Legacy (1997)
Charles at Fifty (1998)
William Shakespeare: His Life and Work (1999)
Liber Amicorum for Frank Kermode (1999, editor with Ursula Owen)
The Mind Has Mountains: a.alvarez@lxx (1999, editor with Frank Kermode)
The Drama of Love, Life and Death in Shakespeare (2000)
Shakespeare: An Illustrated Biography (2002)
The Wit in the Dungeon (2005), biography of Leigh Hunt
 All In: Texas Hold'em as Played on Late-Night TV (2005)
Lorenzo Da Ponte, The Man Who Wrote Mozart (2006)
Olivier (2007, Max Press)
 Bigger Deal: A Year on the New Poker Circuit (2007)
Holden on Hold'Em (2008)
Poems That Make Grown Men Cry (2014, editor with Ben Holden)
Poems That Make Grown Women Cry (2016, editor with Ben Holden)
He Played For His Wife and other stories (2017, editor with Natalie Galustian)
Based on a True Story: A Writer's Life (2021)

References

External links
Holden's articles for  The Observer
Holden discusses his biography of Shakespeare with Charlie Rose (originally broadcast July 31, 2000)
Shakespeare North

1947 births
Living people
Alumni of Merton College, Oxford
British biographers
British male journalists
British republicans
English poker players
British gambling writers
Contestants on University Challenge
British social commentators
Game players from Merseyside
People from Southport
Male biographers
Tchaikovsky scholars
Shakespearean scholars
People educated at Oundle School